The 2022 Salvador Challenger was a professional tennis tournament played on clay courts. It was the first edition of the tournament which was part of the 2022 ATP Challenger Tour. It took place in Salvador, Brazil between 2 and 8 May 2022.

Singles main-draw entrants

Seeds

 1 Rankings as of 25 April 2022.

Other entrants
The following players received wildcards into the singles main draw:
  Gustavo Heide
  João Victor Couto Loureiro
  João Lucas Reis da Silva

The following players received entry into the singles main draw as alternates:
  Mateus Alves
  Gilbert Klier Júnior
  Pol Martín Tiffon
  Cristian Rodríguez
  Gonzalo Villanueva

The following players received entry from the qualifying draw:
  Pedro Boscardin Dias
  Román Andrés Burruchaga
  Matías Franco Descotte
  Conner Huertas del Pino
  Wilson Leite
  Alejo Lorenzo Lingua Lavallén

The following player received entry as a lucky loser:
  Matías Zukas

Champions

Singles

 João Domingues def.  Tomás Barrios Vera 7–6(11–9), 6–1.

Doubles

 Diego Hidalgo /  Cristian Rodríguez def.  Orlando Luz /  Felipe Meligeni Alves 7–5, 6–1.

References

2022 ATP Challenger Tour
May 2022 sports events in Brazil
2022 in Brazilian sport
Salvador Challenger